Community Consolidated School District 181 (D181), also known as Hinsdale Elementary School District 181 or Hinsdale-Clarendon Hills District 181, is a school district headquartered in Clarendon Hills, Illinois. In addition to a portion of Clarendon Hills, the district boundaries include Hinsdale and portions of Burr Ridge and Oak Brook. It is in DuPage County.

History
Prior to 1990 the middle school only had grades 7–8. In 1990 it had 2,600 students. That year the district planned to move 6th graders to the middle school, but it faced parental opposition.

In 2018 Hector Garcia became the superintendent.

Schools
 Middle schools
 Hinsdale Middle School
 Clarendon Hills Middle School
 Elementary schools
 Elm School
 Madison School
 Monroe School
 Oak School
 Prospect School
 The Lane School
 Walker School

Pre-Kindergarten
 Preschool

References

External links
 Community Consolidated School District 181

School districts in DuPage County, Illinois
School districts in Cook County, Illinois